The 2022 UT Martin Skyhawks football team represented University of Tennessee at Martin as a member of the Ohio Valley Conference (OVC) during the 2022 NCAA Division I FCS football season. They were led by 17th-year head coach Jason Simpson and played their games at Graham Stadium in Martin, Tennessee.

Although UT Martin finished as OVC co-champions with Southeast Missouri State (both with 5–0 OVC records), Southeast Missouri State was awarded the automatic bid to the 2022 FCS playoffs while UT Martin was not. Both teams had identical records in conference play, and no game had been played between the two teams that season, as a result of schedule changes to accommodate new member Lindenwood. The tiebreaker to determine an automatic conference bid ultimately then came down to a coin flip, which UT Martin lost.

Schedule

References

UT Martin
UT Martin Skyhawks football seasons
UT Martin Skyhawks football
Ohio Valley Conference football champion seasons